Sebastián Edwards (born 16 August 1953, Santiago, Chile) a member of the Edwards family is a Chilean economist, professor, speaker, and consultant. He is currently the Henry Ford II Professor of International Business Economics at the UCLA Anderson School of Management at the University of California, Los Angeles (UCLA). From 1993 until April 1996, he was the Chief Economist for the Latin America and Caribbean Region of the World Bank. He is also a research associate of the National Bureau of Economic Research (NBER), a member of the advisory board of Transnational Research Corporation and co-chairman of the Inter American Seminar on Economics (IASE).   He is the Past President of the Latin American and Caribbean Economic Association (LACEA), an international professional association of economists with academic interests in Latin America and the Caribbean region.  He was a member of the Scientific Advisory Council of the Kiel Institute of World Economics, Kiel-Germany. He is a member of California Governor Arnold Schwarzenegger's Council of Economic Advisors.

From 1981 through 1993, he was an assistant, associate, and full Professor of economics at UCLA. From 2000 to 2004, he was Professor Extraordinario at the IAE, Universidad Austral, Argentina.

Sebastian Edwards was born in Santiago, Chile. He was educated at the Catholic University of Chile, and received an M.A. and Ph.D. in economics from the University of Chicago.  He is married to economist Alejandra Cox Edwards. They have three grown children and 4 grandchildren.

Author and editor
Edwards is the author of more than 200 scientific articles on international economics, macroeconomics, exchange rates, country risk, international investment, and economic development. His articles have appeared in the  American Economic Review, the Journal of Monetary Economics, The Economic Journal, Oxford Economic Papers, the Journal of Development Economics, the Quarterly Journal of Economics, the Journal of Economic Perspectives and other professional journals.

Edwards is an associate editor of the Journal of International Trade and Economic Development, the Journal of International Financial Markets, Institutions and Money, and Analisis Economico. For almost ten years he was the co-editor of the Journal of Development Economics.

Columnist
His work and views has been frequently quoted in the media, including the New York Times, the Financial Times, the Los Angeles Times, the Wall Street Journal and The Economist.  His op-ed pieces have appeared in the Wall Street Journal, the Financial Times, the Los Angeles Times, the Miami Herald, Newsweek, Time, El País (Madrid), La Vanguardia (Barcelona), La Nación (Argentina), Clarín (Argentina), and La Tercera (Chile). He is also a columnist for Project Syndicate. He is a frequent guest on CNN en Español and other TV and cable news programs.

Novelist
In 2007 he published the novel El Misterio de las Tanias (Alfaguara), a political thriller involving Cuban spies, political kidnappings, and a fabled ransom worth over one billion dollars.  The novel was a bestseller in Chile, where it stayed in the Bestseller list for almost 30 weeks.  El Misterio de las Tanias was released in Argentina in mid 2008 and in the rest of the Spanish speaking world in 2009.

In May 2011 his second novel Un dia perfecto was published by La otra orilla and Editorial Norma. In Un día perfecto two parallel stories develop during one day—June 10, 1962.  On that date Chile's soccer national team unexpectedly defeated the Soviet Union during the World Cup. The first story is a love triangle, while the second one deals with the mysterious disappearance of Lev Yashin, the Soviet famous goalkeeper, known as the "Black Spider". Soon after publication, Un día perfecto joined the list of bestselling novels in Chile. It will be published in the rest of the Spanish speaking world during the second half of 2011.

Other activities
Sebastian Edwards has been a consultant to a number of multilateral institutions, governments and national and international corporations, including the Inter-American Development Bank, the World Bank, the International Monetary Fund, and the Organisation for Economic Co-operation and Development

Professor Edwards has been an expert witness in a number of securities cases that have been litigated in Federal and State courts, and in a number of arbitration cases.

Books

 Conversación interrumpida (2016)
 Toxic Aid: Economic Collapse and Recovery in Tanzania (2014)
 Left Behind: Latin America and the False Promise of Populism (2010)
 The Decline of Latin American Economies (2007)
 Capital Flows and Capital Controls in Emerging Markets (2007)
 The Economics and Political Transition to an Open Market Economy: Colombia (2001). OECD
 Capital Flows and the Emerging Economies (2000). U. of Chicago Press.
 Anatomy of an Emerging-Market Crash: Mexico 1994 (1997). Carnegie Endowment for International Peace
 Labor Markets in Latin America: Combining Social Protection with Market Flexibility (1997). Brookings
 Crisis and Reform in Latin America: From Despair to Hope (1995). Oxford University Press
 Monetarism and Liberalization, The Chilean Experiment (January, 1987), with Alejandra Cox Edwards.
 Exchange Rate Misalignment in Developing Countries (1988)
 Real Exchange Rates, Devaluation and Adjustment: Exchange Rate Policy in Developing Countries (January, 1989)
 Macroeconomics of Populism in Latin America (1989) (coeditor with Rudi Dornbusch).

Sources
UCLA Anderson School of Management, Faculty webpages
Sebastián Edwards, Wikipedia español
Sebastian Edwards' webpage

External links
Sebastian Edwards, UCLA
“El misterio de las Tanias”
NBER Working Papers by Sebastian Edwards
Sebastian Edwards at Project syndicated

1953 births
S
20th-century Chilean economists
Chilean emigrants to the United States
Living people
University of Chicago alumni
UCLA Anderson School of Management faculty
People from Santiago
Pontifical Catholic University of Chile alumni
21st-century Chilean economists